Rabbi Aaron Uri Phoebus Hart (1670 – 1756) was a British rabbi, who served as spiritual leader of the Ashkenazi Great Synagogue of London from 1704 until his death. He is widely regarded as the first chief rabbi of Great Britain.

Biography
He was born in Breslau, Silesia, to Hartwig Moses Hart (also known as Naphtali Hertz of Hamburg) who was a rabbi at Breslau and later at Hamburg. After studying at a yeshiva in Poland, he married the daughter of R. Samuel ben Phoebus of Fürth, author of the Beit Shmuel, a commentary on Eben ha'Ezer.

In 1704 or 1705 he was appointed rabbi of the first Ashkenazic synagogue in London, probably through the influence of his wealthy brother, Moses Hart, founder and parnas of the Great Synagogue, Duke's place, London; and one of the communities two most powerful individuals. Some point to the other of the two most powerful individuals: Abraham of Hamburg (also known as Reb Aberle) a gem dealer, who used his considerable rabbinical knowledge to intimidate the community's spiritual leaders. According to Rubinstein & Jolles: "He almost certainly engineered the downfall of Rabbi Judah Loeb ben Ephraim Anschel in order to replace him with Rabbi Aaron Hart."

In 1706 Hart's approval of a controversial divorce  was criticized by a member Marcus (Mordechai) Moses, whom Abraham of Hamburg (almost certainly with Hart's approval) had previously prevented from opening a small beth midrash. Rabbi Hart responded by excommunicating Moses based on a 12th-century ruling which he claimed authorized him to do so.

Moses turned to other Rabbis who agreed that his excommunication should not stand. Rabbis including Tzvi Ashkenazi and others expressed outrage, criticizing Hart's impetuous and excessive punishment. However, Abraham of Hamburg prevailed on the weak-willed Hart to maintain the excommunication. Moses was forced to start a rival synagogue, later known as the Hambro synagogue.

In 1707, Hart published a defense of his position titled Urim ve-Tummim. It is notable for being the first book printed entirely in Hebrew in London. Rabbi Jochanan Holleschau, one of the Rabbis that sided with Moses, wrote a rebuttal called Ma'aseh Rav.

A portrait of Rabbi Hart hangs in the National Portrait Gallery in London.

Notes

References

External links
 
 
 

1670 births
1756 deaths
18th-century English rabbis
British people of Polish-Jewish descent
Chief rabbis of the United Kingdom
Clergy from Wrocław
People from the Kingdom of Bohemia
Polish emigrants to the United Kingdom
Silesian Jews
Rabbis from London